On Desire is the second studio album by the indie rock band Drowners, released on June 24, 2016.

Track listing

Personnel 
The following individuals were credited for mastering and producing the album.

 Steve Fallone — Mastering
 Claudius Mittendorfer — Engineer, Mixing, Producer
 Erik Lee Snyder — Artwork

References 

2016 albums
Drowners albums